Stephen Thomas McMillan (born 19 January 1976, in Edinburgh) is a Scottish former footballer, who retired from professional football in February 2007. He played for Troon, Motherwell and Wigan Athletic.

Career
McMillan started his career at Scottish Junior side Troon before joining Motherwell in 1993. While at Motherwell, McMillan suffered a broken leg, which would lead to several injury problems in his later career. He bounced back from that unfortunate incident to develop into an all-around defender, able to move forward into attacking positions when needed.

McMillan was sold to Wigan Athletic in March 2001 for £550,000 on the same day as teammate Lee McCulloch. He was an instant hit at Wigan, but a series of injuries ruined his career. He suffered a knee injury setback in 2004, and was out of the game for almost a year, not making an appearance until late in the 2004–05 season. He was only able to make 5 appearances as Wigan were promoted, and he lost his place to the young Leighton Baines. McMillan only made two league appearances for Wigan in their debut Premiership season, against Charlton and Fulham. He picked up a bad knee injury in the League Cup semi-final against Arsenal, which ruled him out for the rest of the season. A year after the knee injury, McMillan announced his retirement on 27 February 2007.

References

External links

1976 births
Living people
Footballers from Edinburgh
Scottish footballers
Association football defenders
Troon F.C. players
Motherwell F.C. players
Wigan Athletic F.C. players
Scottish Premier League players
Scottish Football League players
English Football League players
Premier League players
Scotland under-21 international footballers